Robert Phillip Chin, JP., MP. (born 20 December 1971) is a Jamaican politician. He has been a member of the Jamaica Labour Party since 2006 and is currently the Member of Parliament for the Manchester Southern constituency defeating incumbent Michael Stewart in the General Election on 3rd September 2020.

Political career 

Early in his political career he served on Management Teams in the Saint Andrew North Western, Portland Eastern and Kingston Eastern Constituencies.

He also served as a Vice President and Deputy General Secretary for Generation 2000 (G2K) where he has been intimately involved in various political activities for the Party, which include but limited to, campaigning, polling, recruiting, public relations, workers training, research, fund raising, welfare and social activities.

2016 General Election 
He contested the 2016 General Election on the 25th February 2016 representing the Jamaica Labour Party in the Kingston Central Constituency, going up against the incumbent Ronald Thwaites. Thwaites tallied 5,190 votes to defeat Chin by 1,229 who tallied 3,961 votes.

2020 General Election 
In the 2020 Jamaican general election, he defeated the incumbent Michael Stewart to become Member of Parliament of Manchester Southern in what was considered to be a stronghold for the People's National Party. Chin tallied 6,826 (53.05%) votes to defeat Stewart by 890 votes or 6.91% who tallied 5,936 (46.14%) votes.

References 

Jamaica Labour Party politicians
Living people
1971 births
People from Manchester Parish
Members of the House of Representatives of Jamaica
21st-century Jamaican politicians
Jamaican businesspeople
Members of the 14th Parliament of Jamaica